Masaya Nakamura may refer to:

, Japanese actor
, Japanese businessman
, Japanese photographer